St. Louis, Iron Mountain and Southern Railroad Depot is a historic train station located at Fredericktown, Madison County, Missouri.  It was built in 1869 and expanded about 1908 by the St. Louis, Iron Mountain and Southern Railway.  It is a one-story, rectangular wood-frame building with a gable roof on short wood piers.  The original rectangular section was approximately 25 feet by 65 feet and the addition extended the building approximately 30 feet.  In 1917–1918, the new Fredericktown Missouri Pacific Railroad Depot took over passenger service, while freight continued to be handled by the original depot.

It was added to the National Register of Historic Places in 2005.

References

Fredericktown
Railway stations in the United States opened in 1869
National Register of Historic Places in Madison County, Missouri
Fredericktown
Former railway stations in Missouri